Frankie Avalon is an American singer-songwriter. His discography consists of 7 albums and 41 singles.

Albums

Singles

References

External links
 

Discographies of American artists